Khilwat is a village located in the Bidupur block of Vaishali district in Bihar, India. The native languages of Khilwat are Hindi and Urdu.

References

Villages in Vaishali district